Exploring the Scene! is an album by The Poll Winners, guitarist Barney Kessel with drummer Shelly Manne and bassist Ray Brown, recorded in 1960 and released on the Contemporary label. The album was the  fourth of five to be released by the group.

Reception

The Allmusic review by Scott Yanow stated: "it may very well be their strongest program... Worth searching for".

Track listing
 "Little Susie" (Ray Bryant) - 3:56
 "The Duke" (Dave Brubeck) - 4:53
 "So What" (Miles Davis) - 5:28
 "Misty" (Erroll Garner) - 3:27
 "Doodlin'" (Horace Silver) - 3:32
 "The Golden Striker" (John Lewis) - 3:22
 "Li'l Darlin'" (Neal Hefti) - 5:28
 "The Blessing" (Ornette Coleman) - 4:48
 "This Here" (Bobby Timmons) - 6:35

Personnel
Barney Kessel - guitar
Ray Brown - bass
Shelly Manne - drums

References

Contemporary Records albums
Barney Kessel albums
1960 albums